The Darkest Age: Live '93 is a live album by the Polish death metal band Vader. It was recorded at TS Wisła Sports Hall in Kraków on 13 December 1993 and was originally released on Baron Records in 1994 in cassette format.

Track listing

Personnel 
Production and performance credits are adapted from the album liner notes.

Release history

References 

Vader (band) albums
1993 live albums
Polish-language live albums